Kivitoo: What They Thought of Us is a Canadian documentary film, directed by Zacharias Kunuk and released in 2018. The film explores the history of Kivitoo, an Inuit community on Baffin Island whose residents were evacuated in 1963 due to a temporary safety concern, but who were never able to return to the community following the incident because it was fully demolished by authorities for reasons that have never been publicly confirmed.

The film premiered at the imagineNATIVE Film + Media Arts Festival in 2018.

References

External links
Hunting With My Ancestors Episode 4: Kivitoo - What they thought of us?

2018 films
Canadian documentary films
Films directed by Zacharias Kunuk
Documentary films about Inuit in Canada
2010s Canadian films